Eric Anthony Bowie was a judge who served on the Tax Court of Canada.

References

Judges of the Federal Court of Canada
Scottish emigrants to Canada
1936 births
2019 deaths